Puccini for Beginners is a 2006 American romantic comedy film written and directed by Maria Maggenti and starring Elizabeth Reaser, Gretchen Mol, and Justin Kirk. The film debuted at the 2006 Sundance Film Festival, and was released to DVD in the United States on July 3, 2007.

Plot
The story begins with Samantha (Julianne Nicholson) breaking up with Allegra (Elizabeth Reaser), a lesbian author who has had relationship problems in the past. Allegra meets a man named Philip (Justin Kirk) at a party, with whom she feels a connection. The next day, she meets Grace (Gretchen Mol), Philip's ex-girlfriend, although Allegra does not know about it. Allegra and Philip begin seeing each other, and Philip leaves Grace for good. Allegra sees Grace outside of a movie theater and Grace cries about her boyfriend leaving her. Allegra goes on a date with Philip, but she leaves after thoughts in her mind tell her it is wrong to be with a guy.

Allegra goes back and forth on dates with Philip and Grace. After several more dates, Grace shows Allegra a picture of her ex-boyfriend, and she learns that Philip and Grace were together. Philip and Grace go out for dinner, where they reveal to each other that they are seeing someone else. Meanwhile, Allegra caters at a party, which turns out to be Samantha's engagement party. Philip and Grace show up at the party, and they both discover that they have been seeing the same woman. In the end, Allegra is back with Samantha and never sees Philip and Grace again.

Cast
 Elizabeth Reaser as Allegra
 Gretchen Mol as Grace
 Justin Kirk as Philip
 Julianne Nicholson as Samantha
 Jennifer Dundas as Molly
 Tina Benko as Nell
 Kate Simses as Vivian
 Brian Letscher as Jeff
 Will Bozarth as Jimmy
 Ken Barnett as Scott

References

External links
 
 
 
 

2006 films
2006 romantic comedy films
2000s English-language films
American screwball comedy films
American LGBT-related films
Female bisexuality in film
Lesbian-related films
LGBT-related romantic comedy films
2000s American films